Gliniany may refer to the following places:
 Gliniany, Lower Silesian Voivodeship (south-west Poland)
 Gliniany, Świętokrzyskie Voivodeship (south-central Poland)
 Hlyniany, Lviv oblast, Ukraine (formerly Gliniany, Poland; and formerly in Galicia, Austro-Hungarian Empire)